Georg Kessler (born 23 September 1932) is a German former football manager.

Honours
Sparta Rotterdam
KNVB Cup runner-up: 1970–71

Anderlecht
Belgian First Division: 1971–72
Belgian Cup: 1971–72

Hertha BSC
DFB-Pokal runner-up: 1976–77

Wacker Innsbruck
Austrian Cup: 1977–78

AZ Alkmaar
Eredivisie: 1980–81
KNVB Cup: 1980–81, 1981–82
UEFA Cup runner-up: 1980–81

Club Brugge
Belgian Cup runner-up: 1982–83

1. FC Köln
UEFA Cup runner-up: 1985–86

External links

 
 Georg Keßler at Clubbrugge.be 
 

1932 births
Living people
Sportspeople from Saarbrücken
German footballers
Footballers from Saarland
Association football defenders
German football managers
Bundesliga managers
Netherlands national football team managers
Sparta Rotterdam managers
R.S.C. Anderlecht managers
PEC Zwolle managers
Hertha BSC managers
FC Wacker Innsbruck managers
AZ Alkmaar managers
Club Brugge KV head coaches
Olympiacos F.C. managers
1. FC Köln managers
Royal Antwerp F.C. managers
Standard Liège managers
Fortuna Sittard managers
German expatriate football managers
German expatriate sportspeople in the Netherlands
Expatriate football managers in the Netherlands
West German expatriate sportspeople in Austria
Expatriate football managers in Austria
German expatriate sportspeople in Belgium
Expatriate football managers in Belgium
West German expatriate sportspeople in Greece
Expatriate football managers in Greece
West German footballers
West German football managers
German people of Dutch descent
West German expatriate football managers
West German expatriate sportspeople in the Netherlands
West German expatriate sportspeople in Belgium